The Stonewall Jets are a junior hockey team that plays in Stonewall, Manitoba, Canada. The Jets home arena is Veterans Memorial Sports Complex which is also home to the Stonewall Collegiate Institute Rams, Stonewall Blues Minor Hockey Association and Stonewall Flyers Senior hockey club. The Jets previously played in the Ice Palace (Stonewall Arena).

History
Previously the Jets played in the MJBHL (1964-2001). Stonewall joined the Manitoba Major Junior Hockey League in 2001. Their first head coach in the MMJHL was Ed Harvie. Their first general manager was Bill Smith. Their biggest rival is the Charleswood Hawks.

The Jets won their first championship in 2016 with a dramatic finish to the season. Facing elimination in the first round, Stonewall rallied to win three-straight games and advance. Stonewall then swept the regular season winner Raiders Junior Hockey Club before sweeping Pembina Valley Twisters in the finals.

Stonewall returned to the MMJHL Finals in 2017, but came up short in their bid for back-to-back championships falling in six games to the Raiders Junior Hockey Club.

Season-by-season

League championships

Jack Mackenzie Trophy (playoffs) 
 2016

Art Moug Trophy (regular season)
 none

References

External links 
 Stonewall Jets website

Ice hockey teams in Manitoba
Stonewall, Manitoba